Alan George Marshall may refer to:
 Alan G. Marshall (born 1944), American analytical chemist
 Alan Marshall (cricketer) (1895–1973), English cricketer